Montpellier Méditerranée Métropole is the métropole, an intercommunal structure, centred on the city of Montpellier. It is located in the Hérault department, in the Occitanie region, southern France. It was created in January 2015, replacing the previous Communauté d'agglomération de Montpellier. Its area is 421.8 km2. Its population was 481,276 in 2018, of which 290,053 in Montpellier proper.

History 
The district of Montpellier was created in 1965. In 2001, it became an agglomeration community. On January 1, 2015, the Métropolian community replaced the agglomeration community in accordance with a law of January 2014.

Composition 
Montpellier Méditerranée Métropole covers the following 31 communes. The communes with « ° » are the 15 members of the former district of Montpellier.

Baillargues°
Beaulieu
Castelnau-le-Lez°
Castries
Clapiers°
Cournonsec
Cournonterral
Le Crès°
Fabrègues
Grabels°
Jacou°
Juvignac°
Lattes°
Lavérune
Montaud
Montferrier-sur-Lez°
Montpellier°
Murviel-lès-Montpellier
Pérols°
Pignan
Prades-le-Lez°
Restinclières
Saint-Brès
Saint-Drézéry
Saint-Geniès-des-Mourgues
Saint-Georges-d'Orques
Saint-Jean-de-Védas°
Saussan
Sussargues
Vendargues°
Villeneuve-lès-Maguelone

Palavas-les-Flots left the Agglomeration community of Montpellier Agglomération on January 1, 2005. The commune was one of the initial member communes of the "district de Montpellier".

See also
 Transports de l'agglomération de Montpellier

References

Montpellier
Montpellier
Montpellier